Jaraczewo  is a town in Jarocin County, Greater Poland Voivodeship, in west-central Poland. It is the seat of the gmina (administrative district) called Gmina Jaraczewo.

The town has a population of 1,392.

History

Jaraczewo was granted town rights in 1519 by Polish King Sigismund I the Old. The name comes from the Old Polish male name Jaracz. Jaraczewo was a private town of Polish nobility, administratively located in the Pyzdry County in the Kalisz Voivodeship in the Greater Poland Province of the Polish Crown. The Jaraczewski noble family hailed from the town.

Under German occupation during World War II it was renamed Obragrund to erase traces of Polish origin. On February 9, 1945 American B-17G crashed near the town trying to make its way to Soviet controlled territory, after in air collision during bombing mission in Germany.

Sports
The local football team is GKS Jaraczewo. It competes in the lower leagues.

References

Cities and towns in Greater Poland Voivodeship